Only players born on or after 1 January 1986 were eligible to play. Players in bold have made their senior international debuts prior to the competition or afterwards.

Group A

Head coach: Yuri Kurnenin

Head coach: Pierluigi Casiraghi

Head coach: Slobodan Krčmarević

Head coach: Tommy Söderberg and Jörgen Lennartsson

Group B

Head coach: Stuart Pearce 

Note: ''All information accurate at start of tournament, on 15 June 2009.

Head coach: Markku Kanerva

Head coach: Horst Hrubesch

Head coach: Juan Ramón López Caro

Footnotes

Squads
UEFA European Under-21 Championship squads